Fritz Bieler (September 9, 1895 - September 1, 1957) was a German aviator that served in the First World War, and in 1921 was hired as a flight instructor by the Mexican Air Force.

Fritz Bieler died in Mexico City on 1 September 1957.

References

External links
Legendarios en la Aeronáutica de México, por Manuel Ruiz Romero. Editorial Alianza, México, 1997.
Ralph O'Neill en México 
Llega el avión "El Golfo", noticias de 4/marzo/1927: 
Vuelo de Canadá-México 

1895 births
1957 deaths
German emigrants to Mexico
Mexican military personnel
Mexican aviators